Michael Benedikt may refer to:

 Michael Benedikt (urbanist), urban architect and professor at the University of Texas, Austin
 Michael Benedikt (poet) (1935–2007), American poet

See also
Michael Benedict (disambiguation)